The women's 100 metre breaststroke event at the 2008 Olympic Games took place on 10–12 August at the Beijing National Aquatics Center in Beijing, China.

After winning a silver medal in Sydney and a bronze in Athens, Australia's Leisel Jones stormed home on the final lap to claim an elusive gold in the event. She established an Olympic record of 1:05.17, just eight-hundredths of a second (0.08) off her global standard. Coming from fifth place in the turn, U.S. swimmer Rebecca Soni earned a silver medal in 1:06.73. Finishing fourth from the Olympic trials, she inherited a place in the event after Jessica Hardy's sudden withdrawal from the Games because of a doping irregularity. Meanwhile, Mirna Jukić posted a time of 1:07.34 to settle for the bronze, holding off Russia's Yuliya Yefimova (1:07.43) to fourth place by almost a tenth of a second (0.10).

Megan Jendrick, former Olympic champion from Sydney in 2000, finished fifth with a time of 1:07.62, edging out Aussie Tarnee White (1:07.63) in a close race by a hundredth of a second (0.01). China's Sun Ye (1:08.08) and Japan's Asami Kitagawa (1:08.43) rounded out the finale.

Earlier in the prelims, Jones opened up her meet by breaking a new Olympic record of 1:05.64, exactly a full second faster than a winning time set by Luo Xuejuan in Athens four years earlier.

Records
Prior to this competition, the existing world and Olympic records were as follows.

The following new world and Olympic records were set during this competition.

Results

Heats

Semifinals

Semifinal 1

Semifinal 2

Final

References

External links
Official Olympic Report

Women's breaststroke 100 metre
2008 in women's swimming
Women's events at the 2008 Summer Olympics